Fory Etterle (24 May 1908–16 September 1983) was a Romanian film actor.

Biography
Born in Ploiești, he attended the city's Ion Luca Caragiale High School. After taking courses at the Faculty of Law of the University of Bucharest, he studied at the Conservatory of Dramatic Art in Bucharest under Lucia Sturdza-Bulandra, graduating in 1929.

Selected filmography
 Life Triumphs (1951)
 The Sun Rises (1954)
 Alarm in the Mountains (1955)
 Stormy Bird (1956)
 Telegrame (1959)
  (1960)
  (1960)
 Darclee (1961)
  (1961)
 Lupeni 29 (1962)
  (1962)
  (1963)
  (1964)
  (1965)
  (1965)
 The White Moor (1965)
 The Lace Wars (1965)
 Haiducii (1966)
  (1967)
  (1968)
  (1968)
 Kampf um Rom (1968)
  (1970)
 Michael the Brave (1971)
  (1971)
 Tonight We'll Dance at Home (1972)

References

External links 
 

1908 births
1983 deaths
People from Ploiești
Romanian male film actors
Romanian male stage actors